Barcelona is an unincorporated community in Crawford County, Arkansas, United States.

A post office called Barcelona was established in 1888, and remained in operation until 1896.

References

Unincorporated communities in Crawford County, Arkansas
Unincorporated communities in Arkansas